is a fictional character from the Tekken fighting game franchise by Bandai Namco Entertainment, making her debut in Tekken 7. A professional kickboxer, Josie hopes to join the Tekken Force, an organization that has helped her country. Much like fellow Tekken 7 newcomer Lucky Chloe, Josie has received mixed reception.

Creation and gameplay
Josie Rizal is a young woman from the Philippines. She wears a yellow top, a blue miniskirt, and a red rabbit ear-like hair accessory. Her fighting is a mix of kickboxing and eskrima. Josie practices eskrima, the native martial art and the national sport of her home country, combined with kickboxing reminiscent of Yaw-Yan, an indigenous kickboxing martial art. She lacks the characteristic sticks used in eskrima, instead fighting completely unarmed. Josie's name is based on José Rizal, a national hero from the Philippines. Though, she bares little resemblance to him, besides the name and ethnicity. Josie's moveset carries similarities to older Tekken character Bruce Irvin, and some of her moves were inspired by famous Filipino boxer Manny Pacquiao. Appearance and personality-wise, she also bear similarities to Soulcalibur'''s Talim.

Josie was designed by character designer Mari Shimazaki, known for her work in the Bayonetta series. The character was created in response to the growing popularity of the series in the Philippines.

In Tekken 7
Josie was a big crybaby from a young age, unlike her parents who were fans of martial arts. They insisted she also train in martial arts, which she initially refuses, but eventually she reluctantly agrees to her parents' expectations. However, she is unable to get over her crybaby nature whilst she undergoes training in kickboxing.

After Josie grew more accustomed to her training, she became a professional kickboxer and a model to help get her household's finances on track, until a large typhoon struck their home. When the Mishima Zaibatsu sends the Tekken Force, to give relief aids to the typhoon victims in her ravaged country, Josie aspires to become the member of the Tekken Force. She eventually decides to join the Tekken Force by taking an employment examination.

Reception
Josie has received mixed reception, as noted by Kotaku. Filipino poet Adonis Durado criticized Josie, stating "The problem with Josie Rizal’s character is too obvious: it doesn’t have any trace of Filipino-ness-neither in her physical attributes nor in her outfit."  Durado also questioned the lack of arnis sticks in her attacks. Similarly, IGN staff writer Kenn Leandre was critical of the character, questioning "Even if one is going to create a token character from The Philippines, the least you could do is create someone that looks like he or she came from the streets of Manila or Palawan. Is it too hard to do?" Leandre also lambasts her name for being similar to José Rizal.

A professor of the University of the Philippines criticized Josie, claiming she does not look Filipino, telling Bandai Namco "You have all the money in the world. All it takes is simple research."

Despite the mixed reception, shortly after Josie was introduced to the public on March 29, 2015, she became a trending topic on Twitter with many Filipino fans expressing generally positive reactions. Director Katsuhiro Harada also claimed that 90-percent of the feedback on Josie was positive upon reveal.

In a review of Tekken 7'', Matt S. of Digitally Downloaded singled out Josie as a character they really like in the game, and described her legs as "sexy."

Cultural impact
Just two days after Josie was officially announced, someone claiming to be an official from the Philippine National Center for Culture and the Arts told the Philippine media that they plan to "take steps to correct any wrong impression Josie Rizal may have given about Dr. Rizal and the Philippines." However, three days later NCCA legal counsel Trixie Cruz-Angeles clarified that the agency had yet to issue any position on the matter in a post she made in her personal Facebook page stating "The NCCA has not asked for the deletion of Tekken character Josie Rizal. In fact, the NCCA has not taken cognizance of the issue nor issued an opinion. If you've been reading that website, unders. The name of our chairman is Prof. Felipe de Leon, Jr. Also, matters pertaining to national heroes are within the jurisdiction of the National Historical Commission of the Philippines."

Josie has been cosplayed by actress Nadine Lustre. Harada declared it as a "perfect" cosplay.

References

Female characters in video games
Fictional martial artists in video games
Fictional eskrimadors
Fictional Filipino people
Fictional kickboxers
Fictional models
Tekken characters
Video game characters introduced in 2015